= Aldo Mausner =

Italian violinist (1934–2019)

Aldo Mausner (8 March 1934 – September 2019) was an Italian violinist.

Born on 8 March 1934, he and his parents survived World War II. Mausner was raised Catholic, but was of Jewish heritage. He died in September 2019, at the age of 85.
